Sir Frederick Geoffrey Shedden  (8 August 1893 – 8 July 1971) was an Australian public servant who served as Secretary of the Department of Defence from 1937 to 1956.

Background and early life
Frederick Shedden was born 8 August 1893 in Kyneton, Victoria. His father was George Shedden, a wheelwright born in Victoria. His mother was Sarah Elizabeth (née Grey) from England. He was the youngest of five children.

His was schooled at Kyneton State and Kyneton Grammar schools.

Career
After placing very high in the Commonwealth Public Service examination, in March 1910 Shedden began his career in the Department of Defence at Victoria Barracks, Melbourne. He also studied law at Melbourne University, but the outbreak of World War One ended his studies.

On 19 March 1917 he was appointed a lieutenant in the Australian Army Pay Corps. He served as the 4th Australian Divisions acting paymaster in August. On his return home he was discharged from the Australian Imperial Force on 24 December 1917.

Shedden was Secretary to the Australian Government Department responsible for defence between 1937 and 1956:
 Secretary of the Department of Defence (II) (1937 to 1939)
Secretary of the Department of Defence Co-ordination (1939 to 1942)
Secretary of the Department of Home Security (1941)
Secretary of the Department of Defence (III) (1942 to 1956)

Private life 
On 14 December 1927, Shedden married Anne Cardno Edward. Later that same day he sailed for England to study at the Imperial Defence College.

Awards and honours
In the King's Birthday Honours of June 1933, Shedden was appointed an Officer of the Order of the British Empire (OBE). He was also appointed a Companion of the Order of St Michael and St George (CMG) in the New Year's Day Honours of 1941, and knighted as a Knight Commander of the Order of St Michael and St George (KCMG) in the King's Birthday Honours of June 1943.

Death 
Shedden died on 8 July 1971 in St Andrew's Hospital, East Melbourne.

He was the subject of a biography, Defence Supremo written by David Horner and published by Allen & Unwin in 2000.

In 2009, a street in the Canberra suburb of Casey was named Shedden Street in his honour.

References

|-

|-

|-

1893 births
1971 deaths
Australian Army officers
Australian military personnel of World War I
Australian Knights Commander of the Order of St Michael and St George
Australian Officers of the Order of the British Empire
Secretaries of the Australian Department of Defence
People from Kyneton
Graduates of the Royal College of Defence Studies